Club Bàsquet Alcúdia is a professional basketball team based in Alcúdia, Balearic Islands that is not currently registered in any competition. In season 2007–08, the team played in LEB Oro.

History

CB Alcúdia played in balearic competitions until 2004-05, when they merge with CB Aracena and they play in LEB Plata with the name of Alcúdia-Aracena. With Eloy Doce as coach, they reach the LEB Oro in their first season.

Due to problems with the pavilion, the team goes to Palma Arena in Palma de Mallorca where plays the LEB Oro matches until 2007-08 season with the sponsorship name Palma Aqua Màgica. Palma reaches the play-offs two times in a row.

After the 2007-08 season, due to economic problems, Palma Aqua Màgica renounces to play in LEB Oro and comes back to balearic divisions.

Season by season

Notable players
 Lou Roe
 Robert Battle
 Xavi Vallmajó

External links
Federación Española de Baloncesto
Official Palma Aqua Mágica page

Defunct basketball teams in Spain
Basketball teams established in 1983
Sport in Mallorca
Basketball teams in the Balearic Islands